The dusky crested flycatcher (Elminia nigromitrata) is a species of bird in the family Stenostiridae.
It is widespread across the African tropical rainforest.
Its natural habitats are subtropical or tropical moist lowland forests and subtropical or tropical moist montane forests.

References

dusky crested flycatcher
Birds of the African tropical rainforest
dusky crested flycatcher
Taxonomy articles created by Polbot